The Danish Ladies Open was a women's professional golf tournament on the Ladies European Tour played between 1988 and 1997, the national open golf championship of Denmark.

The tournament also featured on the Swedish Golf Tour in 1988, 1989, and 2002, as well as again in 2022, when it was also an LET Access Series event.

At only 18, Florence Descampe became the LET's youngest winner at the time when she won the inaugural event in 1988.

It was succeeded on the LET schedule in 2005 by the Danish Ladies Masters.

Winners 

Source:

See also
 National open golf championship
 Danish Ladies Masters

References

External links
Ladies European Tour

Former Ladies European Tour events
LET Access Series events
Swedish Golf Tour (women) events
Golf tournaments in Denmark